John Steven Lesmeister (October 3, 1955 – February 28, 2006) was a North Dakota politician who served as the 30th North Dakota State Treasurer from 1981 to 1984.

Biography
Lesmeister was born in Dickinson, North Dakota, and grew up in Halliday, North Dakota, where he was graduated from high school in 1973.

After earning a history and English degree four years later from the University of Mary in Bismarck, North Dakota, he sold real estate and was Mary's admissions coordinator before he ran for state treasurer. He won the Republican endorsement in 1980 at age 25.

A Republican, Lesmeister was elected state treasurer in 1980, narrowly defeating incumbent Democrat Bob Hanson. Hanson ran against Lesmeister four years later and ousted him in another close race.

After the loss, Lesmeister ran unsuccessfully for state labor commissioner in 1986—it was an elected office at the time—and briefly sought Republican support two years later to run for secretary of state.

He moved to Fargo, North Dakota, in 1990, where he worked at Innovis Health and as a substitute teacher.

Lesmeister died in Fargo, North Dakota, on February 28, 2006, of natural causes.

References

External links
 

1955 births
2006 deaths
State treasurers of North Dakota
University of Mary alumni
People from Dickinson, North Dakota
People from Dunn County, North Dakota
North Dakota Republicans
20th-century American politicians